Scaeochlamys is a genus of bivalves belonging to subfamily Pedinae of the family Pectinidae.

Species

Synonyms
 Scaeochlamys farreri (H. K. Jones & Preston, 1904): synonym of Azumapecten farreri (K. H. Jones & Preston, 1904) (unaccepted combination)
 Scaeochlamys squamea Dijkstra & Maestrati, 2009: synonym of Scaeochlamys squamata (Gmelin, 1791)
 Scaeochlamys superficialis (Forsskål in Niebuhr, 1775): synonym of Laevichlamys superficialis (Forsskål in Niebuhr, 1775)

References

 Dijkstra, H.H. & Maestrati, P., 2009. New bathyal species and records of Pectinoidea (Bivalvia: Propeamussiidae and Pectinidae) from Taiwan. Bulletin of Malacology, Taiwan 33: 37-54

External links
 Iredale, T. (1929). Mollusca from the continental shelf of eastern Australia. Records of the Australian Museum. 17(4): 157-189
 Dijkstra, H. H. (2013). Pectinoidea (Bivalvia: Propeamussiidae and Pectinidae) from the Panglao region, Philippine Islands. Vita Malacologica. 10: 1-108

Pectinidae
Bivalve genera